Comedy of Errors (1967–1990) was a champion British Thoroughbred National Hunt racehorse. He won the Champion Hurdle in 1973 and 1975, becoming one of only two horses to regain British hurdling's top prize. A huge horse of over 17 hands, "Comedy", as he was affectionately known, won 23 races. Timeform rate him among the top half-dozen hurdlers ever in Britain.

Background
Comedy of Errors was a brown horse sired by the King's Stand Stakes winner Goldhill out of the mare Comedy Actress. He was trained by Fred Rimell at Kinnersley in Worcestershire. and ridden by Bill Smith and Ken White.

Racing career
Comedy of Errors finished second in the Gloucestershire Hurdle at the 1972 Cheltenham Festival.

In 1973 he won his first Champion Hurdle, beating Bula who had won the race in 1971 and 1972.

He finished runner-up to Lanzarote in the 1974 championship but returned to regain the title in 1975.

Retirement
After his retirement, Comedy of Errors was used for many years by Fred Rimell's wife Mercy who described him as being a perfect riding horse.

References

1967 racehorse births
1990 racehorse deaths
Racehorses bred in the United Kingdom
Racehorses trained in the United Kingdom
Thoroughbred family 8-h
Cheltenham Festival winners
National Hunt racehorses
Champion Hurdle winners